Syrinx, L. 129, is a piece of music for solo flute which Claude Debussy wrote in 1913. It generally takes three minutes or less to perform. It was the first significant piece for solo flute after the Sonata in A minor composed by C. P. E. Bach over 150 years before (1747), and it is the first such solo composition for the modern Böhm flute, developed in 1847. 

Syrinx is commonly considered to be an indispensable part of any flutist's repertoire.  Many musical historians believe that "Syrinx", which gives the performer generous room for interpretation and emotion, played a pivotal role in the development of solo flute music in the early twentieth century.  Some say Syrinx was originally written by Debussy without barlines or breath marks. The flutist Marcel Moyse may have later added these, and most publishers publish Moyse's edition. 

The piece is commonly performed off stage, as it is thought when Debussy dedicated the piece to the flutist Louis Fleury, it was for him to play during the interval of one of Debussy's ballets.

Syrinx was written as part of incidental music to the play Psyché by Gabriel Mourey, and was originally called "Flûte de Pan".  It was given its final name in reference to the myth of the amorous pursuit of the nymph Syrinx by the god Pan, in which Pan falls in love with Syrinx, however, as Syrinx does not return the love to Pan, she turns herself into a water reed and hides in the marshes. Pan cuts the reeds to make his pipes, in turn killing his love.

Syrinx has also been transposed and performed on the saxophone and other instruments. It quickly became a piece of standard literature for the saxophone, and has been recorded on both the alto and soprano saxophones. It is also a track on Caprice  by the trumpeter Alison Balsom .

Notes

External links
 
Free recording from Emily Shin of the Columbia University Orchestra.
Free HD Video Recording from Singaporean Flutist Jed Huang (UC Berkeley Alum)

Compositions by Claude Debussy
Solo flute pieces
Incidental music
1913 compositions
Music based on Metamorphoses